Lyudmila Alekseevna Perepyolkina (2 February 1930 – 2 December 2014) was a Soviet-Russian stage and film actress.

Biography
Perepyolkina graduated from the Boris Shchukin Theatre Institute. She appeared on stage in works by such authors as Goncharov, Dunayev and Efros. She died on 2 December 2014, aged 84, at the Botkin Hospital in Moscow.

Selected stage roles
  Three Sisters  (Olga)
  At the Ball of Fortune  (Marie)
  The Visit of Ladies  (Clara)
  Counterfeit Coins (Natasha)
  Restless Hero of the Day   (Eve)
  Man of the Song  (Olga)
  Brooklyn Idyll  (Stella)
  Argonauts  (Natasha)
  Calico Ball  (Svetlana)
  Stranglehold  (Jill)
  Glory  (Natasha)
  Without Naming Names   (Poema)
  Mr. Dead  (Vukitsa)
  Comedy of Frol Skobelev  (Barbara)
  Summer and Smoke  (Alma's mother)
  One Calorie of Tenderness  (Grandmother)
  Grandma Blues  (Vera Konstantinovna)
  Der Rosenkavalier   (Fraulein Blyumenblat)

Filmography
 1953:  Mother or Woman  (Johanna Sillankorva; Russian voice)
 1956:  Path of Thunder  (Selia)
 1978:  Only...  (Maria Nikolaevna)

Awards
 Honored Artist of the RSFSR (2 March 1971)
 Medal of the Order of Merit for the Fatherland, 2nd class (1997)

References

External links
 
 Profile, kino-teatr.ru; accessed 4 December 2014 
 Profile, vipteatr.ru; accessed 4 December 2014 

1930 births
2014 deaths
Actresses from Moscow
Recipients of the Order "For Merit to the Fatherland", 2nd class
Honored Artists of the RSFSR
Soviet film actresses
Soviet stage actresses
Soviet voice actresses
Russian stage actresses